Compliance is a response—specifically, a submission—made in reaction to a request.  The request may be explicit (e.g., foot-in-the-door technique) or implicit (e.g., advertising). The target may or may not recognize that they are being urged to act in a particular way.

Social psychology is centered on the idea of social influence. Defined as the effect that the words, actions, or mere presence of other people (real or imagined) have on our thoughts, feelings, attitudes, or behavior; social influence is the driving force behind compliance. It is important that psychologists and ordinary people alike recognize that social influence extends beyond our behavior—to our thoughts, feelings, and beliefs—and that it takes on many forms.  Persuasion and the gaining of compliance are particularly significant types of social influence since they utilize the respective effect's power to attain the submission of others.  Studying compliance is significant because it is a type of social influence that affects our everyday behavior—especially social interactions.  Compliance itself is a complicated concept that must be studied in depth so that its uses, implications, and both its theoretical and experimental approaches may be better understood.

Personality psychology vs. social psychology 

In the study of personality psychology, certain personality disorders display characteristics involving the need to gain compliance or control over others: 
 Those with antisocial personality disorder tend to display a glibness and grandiose sense of self-worth. Due to their shallow affect and lack of remorse or empathy, they are well suited to con and/or manipulate others into complying with their wishes. 
 Those with histrionic personality disorder need to be the center of attention; and in turn, draw people in so they may use (and eventually dispose of) their relationship.  
 Those with narcissistic personality disorder have inflated self-importance, hypersensitivity to criticism and a sense of entitlement that compels them to persuade others to comply with their requests.

Social psychologists view compliance as a means of social influence used to reach goals and attain social or personal gains. Rather than concentrating on an individual's personality or characteristics (that may drive their actions), social psychology focuses on people as a whole and how thoughts, feelings and behaviors allow individuals to attain compliance and/or make them vulnerable to complying with the demands of others.  Their gaining of or submission to compliance is frequently influenced by construals—i.e. an individual's interpretation of their social environment and interactions.

Major theoretical approaches 
The study of compliance is often recognized for the overt demonstrations of dramatic experiments such as the Stanford prison experiment and the Stanley Milgram shock experiments.  These experiments served as displays of the psychological phenomena of compliance.  Such compliance frequently occurred in response to overt social forces and while these types of studies have provided useful insight into the nature of compliance, today's researchers are inclined to concentrate their efforts on subtle, indirect and/or unconscious social influences.

Those involved in this modern social-cognitive movement are attempting to discover the ways in which subjects' implicit and explicit beliefs, opinions and goals affect information processing and decision making in settings where influential forces are present.

Philosophy vs. social psychology 

Philosophers view compliance in the context of arguments.  Arguments are produced when an individual gives a reason for thinking that a claim is true.  In doing so, they utilize premises (claims) to support their conclusion (opinion).  Regardless of utilization of fallacy forms (e.g., apple-polishing, ad hominem) to get their point across, individuals engaged in philosophical arguments are overtly and logically expressing their opinion(s).  This is an explicit action in which the person on the other side of the argument recognizes that the arguer seeks to gain compliance (acceptance of their conclusion).

In studying compliance, social psychologists aim to examine overt and subtle social influences experienced in various forms by all individuals.   Implicit and explicit psychological processes are also studied since they shape interactions.  This is because these processes explain how certain individuals can make another comply and why someone else succumbs to compliance.

As a means of fulfilling needs 
In complying with the requests of others and/or by following their actions, we seek to maintain the goals of social influence:
 informative social influence
 normative social influence

Informative social influence (goal of accuracy) 
People are motivated to achieve their goals in the most efficient and accurate manner possible.  When faced with information, an individual needs to correctly interpret and react—particularly when faced with compliance-gaining attempts since an inaccurate behavior could result in great loss. With that being said, people attempt to gain an accurate construal of their situation so they may respond accordingly.

Individuals are frequently rewarded for acting in accordance with the beliefs, suggestions and commands of authority figures and/or social norms.  Among other sources, authority may be gained on the basis of societal power, setting and size.  Individuals are likely to comply with an authority figure's (or group's) orders or replicate the actions deemed correct by social norms because of an assumption that the individual is unaware of some important information.  The need to be accurate—and the belief that others know something they do not—often supersedes the individual's personal opinion.

Normative social influence (goal of affiliation) 
Humans are fundamentally motivated by the need to belong—the need for social approval through the maintenance of meaningful social relationships.  This need motivates people to engage in behavior that will induce the approval of their peers.  People are more likely to take actions to cultivate relationships with individuals they like and/or wish to gain approval from.  By complying with others' requests and abiding by norms of social exchange (i.e., the norm of reciprocity), individuals adhere to normative social influence and attain the goal of affiliation. An example of both normative and informational social influence is the Solomon Asch line experiments.

As a product of variables 
Bibb Latané originally proposed the social impact theory that consists of three principles and provides wide-ranging rules that govern these individual processes.  The general theory suggests we think of social impact as the result of social forces operating in a social structure (Latané).  The theory's driving principles can make directional predictions regarding the effects of strength, immediacy, and number on compliance; however, the principles are not capable of specifying precise outcomes for future events.

Strength 
The stronger a group—the more important it is to an individual—the more likely that individual is to comply with social influence.

Immediacy 
The proximity of the group makes an individual more likely to conform and comply with the group's pressures.  These pressures are strongest when the group is closer to the individual and composed of people the individual cares about (e.g., friends, family) and/or authority figures.

Number 
Researches have found that compliance increases as the number of people in the group increases; however, once the group reaches 4 or 5 people, compliance is less likely to occur.  After this point, each additional person has less of an influencing effect.  However, adding more members to a small group (e.g., 3 to 4 people) has a greater effect than adding more members to a larger group (e.g., 53 to 54 people) (Aronson).

Similarity 
Although this variable is not included in Latané's theory, Burger et al. (2004) conducted studies that examined the effect of similarity and compliance to a request.  Note that the shared characteristic (e.g., birthday, first name) had to be perceived as incidental.  The findings demonstrated that people were more likely to comply with the requester when they believed the feature they shared was unplanned and rare.

Displayed by the SIFT-3M model 
A theoretical approach uncommon in major psychology literature is David Straker's, SIFT-3M model.  It was created to discuss mental functioning in relation to psychological decisions (e.g., compliance).  Straker proposes that by gaining a greater understanding of how people make sense of the world, how they think and how they decide to act, people can develop the basic tools needed to change others' minds by gaining compliance.  In inducing compliance, requestors must understand the 9 stages or levels:

In using this model to understand and change the minds of others, Straker reminds requestors that they must talk to the other individual's internal map (thoughts and beliefs) and familiarize themselves with their inner systems.

Gaining techniques 
The following techniques have been proven to effectively induce compliance from another party.

Foot-in-the-door 

In utilizing this technique, the subject is asked to perform a small request—a favor that typically requires minimal involvement. After this, a larger request is presented. According to "successive approximations", because the subject complied with initial requests, they are more likely to feel obligated to fulfill additional favors.

Door-in-the-face 

This technique begins with an initial grand request. This request is expected to be turned down; thus, it is followed by a second, more reasonable request. This technique is decidedly more effective than foot-in-the-door since foot-in-the-door utilizes a gradual escalation of requests.

Low-ball 

Frequently employed by car salesmen, low-balling gains compliance by offering the subject something at a lower price only to increase the price at the last moment.  The buyer is more likely to comply with this price change since they feel like a mental agreement to a contract has occurred.

Ingratiation 

This attempt to obtain compliance involves gaining someone's approval so they will be more likely to appease your demands. Edward E. Jones discusses three forms of ingratiation:
 flattery
 opinion conformity and
 self-presentation (presenting one's own attributes in a manner that appeals to the target)

Norm of reciprocity 

This technique explains that due to the injunctive social norm that people will return a favor when one is granted to them; compliance is more likely to occur when the requestor has previously complied with one of the subject's requests.

Estimation of compliance 
Research also indicates that people tend to underestimate the likelihood that other individuals will comply with requests—called the underestimation of compliance effect.  That is, people tend to assume that friends, but not strangers, will comply with requests to seek assistance.  Yet, in practice, strangers comply with requests more frequently than expected.  Consequently, individuals significantly underestimate the degree to which strangers will comply with requests.

Major empirical findings

Solomon Asch line experiments 

In Solomon Asch's experiment, 50 participants were placed in separate ambiguous situations to determine the extent to which they would conform.  Aside from a single participant, the 7 other experiment members were confederates—individuals who understood the aim of the study and had been instructed to produce pre-selected responses.  In the designated room, a picture of three lines of differing lengths was displayed.  Each confederate was asked questions (e.g., which line is the longest, which line matches the reference line).  In response, confederates gave largely incorrect answers.

Results 
As a result, 1/3 of the participants gave the incorrect answer when the confederates produced unanimously incorrect answer(s).  In accordance to the Goals of Social Influence, participants claimed that even when they knew the unanimous answer was wrong, they felt the group knew something they did not (informational social influence). Asch noted that 74% of subjects conformed to the majority at least once.  The rate of conformity was reduced when one or more confederates provided the correct answer and when participants were allowed to write down their responses rather than verbally stating them.

Significance 
The results of these studies support the notion that people comply to fulfill the need to be accurate and the need to belong.  Additionally, it supports the social impact theory in that the experiment's ability to produce compliance was strengthened by its status (confederates seen as informational authorities), proximity and group size (7:1).

Stanley Milgram's experiment 

Stanley Milgram's experiment set out to provide an explanation for the horrors being committed against Jews trapped in German concentration camps. The compliance to authority demonstrated by people working in concentration camps ignited the question: "Are Germans actually 'evil' or is it possible to make anyone to comply to the orders of an authority figure?" To test this, Stanley Milgram designed an experiment to see if participants would harm (shock) another individual due to the need to comply with authority.  Milgram developed a pseudo-shock generator with labels beginning at 15 volts ("Slight Shock") to 450 volts ("XXX").  Participants took on the role of "teacher" and were informed they would be participating in a learning and memory test.  In doing so, they had to teach the "student" (a confederate in a separate room) a list of words.  The "teacher" was instructed to increase the voltage by 15 and shock the "student" each time he answered incorrectly.  When a subject began to grow uneasy about shocking the confederate (due to voltage level, noises, ethics, etc.) the experimenter would encourage the participant to continue by proclaiming he would assume full responsibility for any harm done to the "student" and by saying phrases such as "It is absolutely essential that you continue." To rule out sadistic tendencies, all 40 "teachers" were male and were screened for competence and intelligence before beginning the experiment.

Results 
100% of male participants delivered up to 300 volts ("Intense") to their assigned "student". 62% of participants administered 375 volts ("Strong Shock") and 63% participants shocked their "student" at the maximum level (450 volts).

When these alterations to the original experiment were made, the rate of compliance was not reduced:
 The victim claimed to have a heart condition
 Subjects were told the experiment was being conducted for marketing purposes
 Before the experiment began, the "student" extracted an explicit agreement from the "teacher" to stop on demand

The rate of compliance was reduced when:
 Two experimenters (conducting the experiment) disagreed about the "teacher" continuing
 Fellow "teachers" refused to continue (in experiments with multiple "teachers")
 Experimenter remained in a different room from the "teacher"
 The "teacher" was instructed to hold the "student's" hand on a shock plate

Significance 

The results of Stanley Milgram's experiments indicate the power of informational and normative aspects of social influence. Participants believed the experimenter was in control and held information he personally did not. "Teachers" also showed a need for affiliation since they appeared to fear deviating from the experimenter's commands. Additionally, authoritative figures appear to have a large impact on the actions of individuals. As previously stated, individuals seeking affiliation and approval are more likely to comply with authority figures' demands.

Stanford prison experiment 

This experiment was conducted to test social influence and compliance to authority through the utilization of a prison life situation. After answering a local newspaper ad (calling for volunteers for a study centered on the effects of prison life), 70 applications were checked for psychological problems, medical disabilities and crime/drug abuse history and reduced to 24 American and Canadian college students from the Stanford area. The all-male participant pool was divided into two groups (guards and prisoners) by flipping a coin. The prison was constructed by boarding up both sides of a corridor in the basement of Stanford's psychology department building. “The Yard” was the only place were prisoners were allowed to walk, eat or exercise—actions that were done blindfolded so they could not identify an exit. Prison cells were located in laboratory rooms where the doors had been removed and replaced with steel bars and cell numbers.

The incarcerated individuals believed they were being kept in the “Stanford County Jail” because before the experiment began, they did not know they would be labeled prisoners. On a random day, prisoners were subjected to an authentic police arrest. Cars arrived at the station and suspects were brought inside where they were booked, read their Miranda rights a second time, fingerprinted and taken to a holding cells where they were left blindfolded.  Each prisoner received chains around their ankles and a stocking (to simulate a shaved head). Additionally, inmates lost their names and were subsequently referred to by their ID number.

Results 
As the experiment progressed, participants assigned to guard positions escalated their aggression. Although guards were instructed not to hit the prisoners, they found ways to humiliate/disrupt them via systematic searches, strip searches, spraying for lice, sexual harassment, denying them of basic rights (e.g., bathroom use) and waking inmates from their sleep for head counts. Social and moral values initially held by the guards were quickly abandoned as they became immersed in their role.

Due to the reality of psychological abuse, prisoners were released 6 days later, after exhibiting pathological behavior and nervous breakdowns.

Significance 
The Stanford Prison Project is a strong example of the power perceived authority can have over others.  In this case, the authority was largely perceived; however, the consequences were real.  Due to the assumed power held by the guards, even the "good" guards felt helpless to intervene. Additionally, none of the guards came late for a shift, called in sick, demanded extra pay for overtime or requested to be discharged from the study before its conclusion.  The guards complied with the alleged demands of the prison while the prisoners complied with the perceived authority of the guards.  Aside from certain instances of rebellion, the prisoners were largely compliant with the guards orders—from strip searches to numerous nightly "bed-checks".

The Experiment—a 2010 film—tells a version of the Stanford Prison Project.  It focuses on 26 men who are chosen/paid to participate in an experiment.  After being assigned the roles of guards and prisoners, the psychological study spirals out of control.

Compliance effect 
Extensive research shows that people find it difficult to say "no" to a request, even when this request originates from a perfect stranger.  For example, in one study, people were asked by a stranger to vandalize a purported library book. Despite obvious discomfort and reluctance of many individuals to write the world "pickle" in one of the pages, more than 64% complied with this vandalism request—more than double the requesters' prediction of a 28% rate of compliance.

In such interactions, people are more likely to comply when asked face-to-face than when asked indirectly or by e-mail.

Significance 
This research shows that we tend to underestimate the influence we have over others, and that our appeal to others is more effective when it is made face to face. It also shows that even a suggestion we make in jest may embolden someone to commit immoral acts.

Nuremberg Trials 

The Nuremberg Trials were a series of tribunals held by the Charter of the International Military Tribunal (IMT) which was made up of members of the Allied Powers – Great Britain, France, the Soviet Union, and the United States – who presided the hearings of twenty-two major Nazi criminals.  In these trials many of the defendants had stated that they had simply been following directions and failure to do so would have resulted in their punishment. By complying to the directions given by those above them in rank they knowingly caused harm and death to those involved in the Holocaust.

Results

At the end of the trials, 199 defendants were tried at Nuremberg. Of the 199 defendants: 161 were convicted with 37 being sentenced to death and 12 of the defendants were tried to by the IMT (International Military Tribunal). Although many involved in the trials were tried, some of the higher-ranking officials had fled Germany to live abroad with some even coming to the United States. An example of this was Adolf Eichmann who had fled and made refuge for himself in Argentina, He was later caught by Israel's Intelligence Service in which he was later tried, found guilty, and executed in 1962.

Significance

The information divulged during the event of the Nuremberg Trials suggest strong evidence in the power enforced over others from that of a higher authority. Many officials in the Nazi party pleaded to just have been following orders.

Applications

Person-to-person interactions 
The use of persuasion to achieve compliance has numerous applications in interpersonal interactions. One party can utilize persuasion techniques to elicit a preferred response from other individuals.  Compliance strategies exploit psychological processes in order to prompt a desired outcome; however, they do not necessarily lead to private acceptance by the targeted individual.  Meaning, an individual may comply with a request without truly believing the action(s) they are being asked to complete is acceptable.  Because of this, persuasion techniques are often used one-sidedly in immediate situations where one individual wishes to provoke a specific response from another individual.  For example, car salesmen frequently use the lowball technique to manipulate customers' psychological functioning by convincing them to comply with a request.  By initially estimating a car's price to be lower than actuality, car salesmen recognize that the customer is more likely to accept a higher price at a later time.  Compliance strategies (e.g., lowball, foot-in-the-door, etc.) are relevant to numerous person-to-person interactions when persuasion is involved.  One individual can use such techniques to gain compliance from the other, swayed person.  Other practical examples include:
 A child asking for an allowance raise with the foot-in-the-door technique
 A student using ingratiation (e.g., flattery) to ask for a raised grade
 An individual doing someone a favor, hoping that the norm of reciprocity will influence that someone to lend a hand at a later date
 A lawyer using ingratiation and their perceived authority to persuade a jury

Marketing 

Research has indicated that compliance techniques have become a major asset to numerous forms of advertising, including Internet shopping sites. Techniques are used to communicate essential information intended to persuade customers. Advertisements and other forms of marketing typically play on the customers' need for informative and normative social influence. The people in the advertisements and the ads themselves serve as a type of authority. They are credible—especially in regards to the product.  As a result, customers' need to be accurate drives them to comply with the ad's message and to purchase a product that an authority claims they need.  Secondly, people have the need to belong.  Customers often comply with ads by purchasing certain merchandise in the hopes of affiliating with a particular group. Because compliance techniques play at psychological needs they are frequently successful in selling a product; the use of fear is often less persuasive.

Law enforcement

Controversies 
While there is some debate over the idea and power of compliance as a whole, the main controversy—stemming from the subject of compliance—is that people are capable of abusing persuasion techniques in order to gain advantages over other individuals.  Based on the psychological processes of social influence, compliance strategies may enable someone to be more easily persuaded towards a particular belief or action (even if they do not privately accept it). As such, the employment of compliance techniques may be utilized to manipulate an individual without their conscious recognition.  A specific issue regarding this controversy has arisen during courtroom proceedings. Studies have shown that lawyers frequently implement these techniques in order to favorably influence a jury. For example, a prosecutor might use ingratiation to flatter a jury or cast an impression of his authority. In such cases, compliance strategies may be unfairly affecting the outcome of trials, which ought to be based on hard facts and justice, not simply persuasiveness.

Conclusion 
Compliance refers to an implicit or explicit response to a request. Based in the roots of social influence, compliance is studied through the use of many different approaches, contexts, and techniques. The implications of compliance from a psychological standpoint infer that by utilizing various techniques (e.g., foot-in-the-door, ingratiation, etc.), personal needs (e.g., informational and social goals) and/or group characteristics (e.g., strength, immediacy, number). It is important to recognize that people are capable of using, or abusing, compliance in order to gain advantage over others. This has caused controversy in a number of settings, and is still being looked at in depth in order to better understand how to use this social phenomenon in a prosocial manner.

Looking forward 
 Social psychologist Laura Brannon is currently working on integrating social influence research into a number of different areas, such as food and safety health, and underage drinking.
 Jerry Burger is currently doing research on how a unique opportunity is perceived with regards to compliance.
 Robert Cialdini is examining how cultural factors come into play with persuasion and compliance.

See also

References

Conformity
Persuasion techniques